The Fort Munro sandstone gecko (Cyrtopodion fortmunroi ) is a species of gecko, a lizard in the family Gekkonidae. The species is endemic to Pakistan.

References

Further reading
Khan MS (1993). "A new sandstone gecko from Fort Munro, Dera Ghazi Khan district, Punjab, Pakistan". Pakistan Journal of Zoology 25 (3): 217–221. (Tenuidactylus fortmunroi, new species).

Cyrtopodion
Reptiles described in 1993